Fortuneteller's Melody is the fifth and final studio album by American country music trio SHeDAISY.  It was released on March 14, 2006. The two singles from Fortuneteller's Melody, "I'm Taking the Wheel" and "In Terms of Love", reached 22 and 32 on the country charts, respectively, on the country charts. "God Bless the American Housewife" (retitled "God Bless the Canadian Housewife") was released as a single in Canada, where it charted in the Top 20.

The version of the song "God Bless the American Housewife" featured on here is different from the version featured on Music from and Inspired by Desperate Housewives.

Track listing

A Titled "God Bless the Canadian Housewife" in Canada.

Personnel

SHeDAISY
Kassidy Osborn - background vocals
Kelsi Osborn - lead vocals
Kristyn Osborn - background vocals

Additional musicians
Dan Dugmore - dobro, pedal steel guitar
Greg Leisz - pedal steel guitar
Jamie Muhoberac - keyboards, piano
Jeff Rothschild - drums
John Shanks - bass guitar, acoustic guitar, electric guitar, keyboards
Jonathan Yudkin - banjo, cello, mandolin, string arrangements, viola, violin

Charts

Weekly charts

Year-end charts

References

2006 albums
SHeDAISY albums
Lyric Street Records albums
Albums produced by John Shanks